Nowruzan or Nauruzan may refer to:
 Nowruzan, Kavar
 Nowruzan, Shiraz